Mount Potter is a mountain in Antarctica named after Noel Potter, Jr., Chairman, Dept. of Geology, Dickinson College, Carlisle, PA. Potter is a glacial geologist who worked in this area during seven seasons.

Mountains of Victoria Land
Scott Coast